Dantu  is a large crater on Ceres, located within the Vendimia Planitia. It is rimmed by a number of minor faculae, which together form Bright Spot 2.

Etymology
The crater is named after Dantu, the timekeeper and first god of planting (millet) of the Gã people of Accra, Ghana.

Formation
Dantu is thought to have formed  Ma (million years) ago, based on the amount of crater impacts present within its ejecta blankets.

Physical features
The walls of Dantu are quite heavily eroded, with most of the north-eastern wall having collapsed completely. Due to Dantu's relatively young age its crater floor is smooth, with few additional craters present within it. Dantu's floor is also home to a system of fractures, which are mostly located in the south of the crater.

The center of Dantu is home to a peak, with a ring complex around said peak. The majority of Dantu's pit craters surround this feature, with said pit craters largely being between 400 and 900 metres in diameter.

References

Further reading

Impact craters on asteroids
Surface features of Ceres